The Battle of Slupčane (Macedonian:Битка за Слупчане, Albanian: Beteja e Sllupçanit) was a military engagement between the Macedonian security Forces and Albanian insurgents belonging to the National Liberation Army (NLA), which at the time, was launching a campaign of guerrilla attacks against facilities of the Macedonian Government, the Macedonian Police force, and the Macedonian Armed Forces.

Battle

Initial NLA attack and Macedonian Counter-Offensive 
On 3 May 2001, the NLA infiltrated the villages of Slupčane and Vaksince, killing two Macedonian soldiers and capturing another one. This caused an almost immediate response by the Macedonian Government, who launched an offensive against the NLA in Slupčane and Vaksince. The Macedonian Army used Mil Mi-24's and tankfire with the goal of driving the NLA out of Slupčane. However, the offensive stalled, when the NLA was not showing any signs of withdrawal. During the Offensive, 5 Albanian civilians were killed.

Operation MH-2 
The most intensive clashes occurred during the first large-scale offensive in Kumanovo, code-named Operation MH-2, on 8 May 2001, at the entrance of the village. Macedonian Army infantry launched an onslaught, deploying one mechanized battalion and using heavy artillery and Mil Mi-24's, causing some NLA soldiers to leave their positions. The offensive started on 8 a.m. But was stopped by Boris Trajkovski on 2 p.m. Ultimately leaving the NLA in control of the village.

Continued fighting and Macedonian shelling 
On 13 May, Macedonian Forces launched an operation in Slupčane and Vaksince. The Macedonian Army claimed to have hit two NLA columns, and claimed they had killed 30 soldiers.

From 14-16 May, Macedonian Government Forces engaged in gunfire with rebels close to Slupčane, which the army characterized as the most intense fighting since May 3rd.

On 17 May, the Macedonian Army shelled the village with artillery from a safe distance, but ceased shelling after six rounds.

On 22 May, NLA rebels attacked Macedonian positions near Slupčane and Vaksince. Macedonian Forces responded by shelling the village. The NLA claimed that six civilians were wounded, and that the minaret of the mosque in Vaksince had been destroyed.

Third Macedonian Offensive 
On 24 May, the Macedonian military launched a massive offensive to reclaim control of ten NLA-held villages in the Kumanovo Karadak region. The operation utilized tanks, artillery, and helicopter gunships to attack the NLA strongholds of Slupčane and Vaksince, as well as their mountain positions beyond, beginning at 8am. In response, the NLA unleashed a barrage of machine-gun fire.

On 26 May, Macedonian Forces managed to recapture Vaksince and claimed to have recaptured Lojane, but were unable to regain control over Slupčane. Macedonian Forces continued to blast Slupčane with helicopter gunships and heavy artillery, NLA rebels responded with mortars, wounding 2 Macedonian soldiers. Although the Macedonian Army managed to capture Vaksince, they were driven out of the village by the NLA, only three days after the initial Offensive.

Fourth Macedonian Offensive 
From 30 May to 1 June, Macedonian security forces carried out an offensive to capture Slupčane, using APC's and T-55 tanks. The village was also shelled on a daily basis. The Offensive was called off, after the "Tigar" Special Forces unit mutinied and had to be withdrawn from the front line, leaving the NLA in control of the village.

Ambush near Slupčane 
On 6th June, the NLA launched an ambush on Macedonian Forces near Slupčane, killing 5 soldiers.

Halting of Operations by Macedonian Forces 
On 11 June 2001, the Macedonian Army received orders to halt all military operations in the Kumanovo-Karadak region. Following an Macedonian attack and ensuing clashes on 10 and 11 June, which left one Macedonian commander (Sinisha Stoilov) and one civilian dead, the Macedonian army ceased all of its bombardment of positions held by the NLA. Hostilities in the vicinity of Slupčane, Orizare, and Matejce also had diminished shortly after.

Aftermath 
On 5 July NLA soldiers from Slupčane launched attacks Macedonian Army sites near Kumanovo.

References 

2001 insurgency in Macedonia
Battles in 2001
Lipkovo Municipality